Auriroa Island is an island in Milne Bay Province of Papua New Guinea.

It is in the Conflict Group archipelago, part of the Louisiade Archipelago  in the Solomon Sea.

References

Islands of Milne Bay Province
Louisiade Archipelago
Uninhabited islands of Papua New Guinea